Elaine Dermody is a camogie player and insurance employee. She won a Soaring Star award in 2009 and won a 2009 All Ireland junior camogie medal. and a 2010 Intermediate Championship. She won an intermediate All-Star camogie medal that year also. With a total of 1-42 she was the second-highest scoring player in the Senior Championship of 2011. In 2013, she won a senior camogie All-Star award, having been selected at full forward.

Career
She captained the county on their first All-Ireland final appearance in 2001 and made the switch from full-back in 2008 to attack, in 2009. She has won Under-18 and two Leinster Junior championships, along with eight county and four provincial medals with her club.

References

External links 
 Official Camogie Website
 Offaly Camogie website
 Review of 2009 championship in On The Ball Official Camogie Magazine
 Video Highlights of 2009 All Ireland Junior Final
 Report of Offaly v Waterford 2009 All Ireland junior final in Irish Times Independent, Examiner and Offaly Express.
 Video highlights of 2009 championship Part One and part two

1982 births
Living people
Offaly camogie players